Main Maa Nahi Banna Chahti ( I don't want to be a mother) is a Pakistani drama serial produced by Moomal Shunaid under their banner Moomal Productions. The drama stars Imran Ashraf and Rabab Hashim in lead roles, and premiered on 18 October 2017 on Hum TV, where it aired on  Wednesday and Thursday at 9 10 Pm .

Cast
Rabab Hashim as Imaan
Ali Abbas as Jibran
Rubina Ashraf as Jibran's mother
Nida Mumtaz as Imaan's mother
Imran Ashraf as Faris
Fatima Jilani
Erum Bashir as Maham

References

External links
Main Maa Nahi Banna Chahti on Official Website

Pakistani drama television series
2017 Pakistani television series debuts
2018 Pakistani television series endings
Urdu-language television shows
Hum TV original programming